Aguinis is a surname. Notable people with the surname include:

Herman Aguinis (born 1966), American researcher and professor serving as Avram Tucker Distinguished Scholar at George Washington University School of Business and Immediate President of the Academy of Management
Marcos Aguinis (born 1935), Argentine writer

Spanish-language surnames